Jawahar Singh was a Jat ruler of the Bharatpur State. He succeeded to the throne when his father Suraj Mal died in 1763.

Early life 
During Ahmed Shah Abdali's invasion of India in 1757, Abdali attacked Ballabhgarh. The fort was put under siege, besieged Jawahar Singh had to escape from the fort in the night as defence of the fort was not possible in the face of heavy bombardments of Abdali's guns. After taking the city Abdali sent his generals Jahan Khan and Najib Khan with 20,000 men to attack Jat territory and holy city of Mathura. According to historian Jadunath Sarkar, Marathas fled from the north and not a single Maratha soldier fought for the holy city of Mathura which had the holiest of Vaishnav shrines, their "Hindupat-Padshahi" didn't involve any duty to protect. But the Jats were determined to defend this sacred city. Jawahar Singh with 10,000 men blocked the path of the Afghans. Among 10,000, 5,000 Jats in Chaumuhan had to face Jahan Khan's troops, In the fight that followed the Jat cavalry charged the Afghan positions and almost ten to twelve thousand men died on both sides and remnants of the Jat army had to retreat. Afghans subsequently carried out a general massacre in the unfortified city of Mathura. The people were looted, their property plundered and act of iconoclasm followed.

Military career

In 1764, Jawahar Singh attacked Najib Khan and later bombarded Delhi. He enlisted help of Sikh chiefs for the campaign. He also asked help of Malhar Rao Holkar. The Rohillas were besieged in the fort and peace negotiations were carried out. Jawahar Singh was also desperate for peace because he realized that Holkar was double dealing with him and was in secret negotiation with Najib Khan. The campaign wasn't much of a success as Jawahar Singh had spent more money then he received.

Jawahar Singh also defeated the Marathas under Holkar with the help of Sikh mercenaries sent by Jassa Singh Ahluwalia near Dholpur in 1766, when Holkar tried to help Jawahar's brother, Nahar Singh to gain the throne of Bharatpur. Jawahar Singh had to retreat after some time when Raghunath Rao came to north Malwa. In 1767, after his recent success against Marathas, he surprised the Maratha garrisons in Kalpi and attacked Maratha territory, Maratha local agent fled and whole area came under the rule of Jawahar Singh.

Battle of Maonda and Mandholi

In 1767, Jawahar Singh allied with the ruler Vijay Singh of Marwar state; and marched through Jaipur territory with his whole army along with artillery to meet Vijay Singh at Pushkar. An agreement was signed between Vijay Singh and Jawahar Singh to oust the Marathas from the north. The meeting between the two was not liked by the Madho Singh.

Jawahar when returning from Pushkar thus attacked the villages of Jaipur in revenge and looted them besides molesting the villagers. The Kachwaha army followed them and at Mandoli, near border of Bharatpur state, Kachwahas delivered their attack and battle broke out. The Rajput artillery had lagged behind giving the Jats initial success. But, later they had to escape into their territory after fierce battle which resulted in heavy casualties from both sides. Baggage and Guns of Bharatpur state had to be abandoned in the battlefield while retreating.

The Rajputs under Madho Singh then decided to invade the Bharatpur state to follow-up their victory. Another battle was fought at Kama resulting in Jawahar's defeat and retreat of Bharatpur army along with Sikh mercenary. The Rajputs later departed due to arrival of fresh contingent of 20,000 Sikhs, who were employed by Jawahar Singh.

Maharaja Jawahar Singh modernized the Jat army by employing Europeans like Sombre to train the Jat army.

Death

He was assassinated by one of his favourite soldiers in August 1768.

References

Dr Natthan Singh: Jat – Itihas (Hindi), Jat Samaj Kalyan Parishad Gwalior, 2004

Rulers of Bharatpur state
1768 deaths
Year of birth unknown
Jat rulers
Jat